Gight is the name of an estate in the parish of Fyvie in the Formartine area of Aberdeenshire, Scotland, United Kingdom. It is best known as the location of the 16th-century Gight (or Formartine) Castle, ancestral home of Lord Byron.

Gight Castle
Gight Castle is about  miles east of Fyvie, just north of the River Ythan, and  mile south of Cottown.
  
The castle was built to an L-shaped plan, probably in the 1570s by George Gordon, the second laird.  Ranges of outbuildings were built later.

The tower has a vaulted basement, and a turnpike stair at the end of a long passage.  There was a hall on the first floor.

George Gordon had no children, and the property passed to his brother, James Gordon of Cairnbannoch and Gight. His son Alexander married Agnes Beaton, daughter of David Beaton, Archbishop of St Andrews. Alexander was killed at Dundee in 1579, and his daughter Elizabeth married George Home, 1st Earl of Dunbar in 1590.

It was later occupied by Catherine Gordon Byron, the mother of Lord Byron, but she sold it in 1787 to George Gordon, 3rd Earl of Aberdeen to pay off her debts. It was then occupied by the Earl's son, George Gordon, Lord Haddo, until the latter's early death in 1791, since when it has been uninhabited. It was designated a scheduled ancient monument in 1965.

The Gight Woods is a protected natural forest.

Folklore 
It is said that the ruins are haunted by a piper who disappeared while exploring an underground passageway.

There is a local legend that Gight Castle was cursed by Scottish prophet Thomas the Rhymer who proclaimed “At Gight three men by sudden death shall dee, And after that the land shall lie in lea”. Almost 500 years later, three men were killed and the prophecy fulfilled.

The nearby river below the ruins is said to contain a treasure hidden by the 7th Laird and guarded by the Devil.

References

Villages in Aberdeenshire
Castles in Aberdeenshire
Scheduled Ancient Monuments in Aberdeenshire